Petra Jászapáti (born 31 December 1998) is a Hungarian short track speed skater. She competed in the women's 500 metres at the 2018 Winter Olympics. At the 2022 Winter Olympics, she won bronze as part of the team for the mixed 2000 metre relay event.

References

External links
 

1998 births
Living people
Hungarian female short track speed skaters
Olympic short track speed skaters of Hungary
Short track speed skaters at the 2018 Winter Olympics
Short track speed skaters at the 2022 Winter Olympics
Sportspeople from Szeged
Short track speed skaters at the 2016 Winter Youth Olympics
Olympic bronze medalists for Hungary
Medalists at the 2022 Winter Olympics
Olympic medalists in short track speed skating
21st-century Hungarian women